The Tabom or Agudas are the Afro-Brazilian community in the south of Ghana who are mostly of Yoruba descent. The Tabom People are an Afro-Brazilian community of former slave returnees. When they arrived in Jamestown, Accra they could speak only Portuguese, and would conspicuously use the phrase "Tá bom" ("Okay"), so the Ga-Adangbe people, who primarily inhabited the Jamestown neighborhood in Accra, started to call them the Tabom.

Origins of the Afro-Brazilian community in Ghana
The Afro-Brazilian descendants and community in the south of Ghana dates back to one study from the 19th century that between an estimated 3,000 and 8,000 former slaves decided to return to Africa.

Up to now, it is not very clear if the Tabom really bought their freedom and decided to immediately come back or if they were at that time free workers in Brazil who came after the Malê revolt of 1835 in Bahia. A lot of Afro-Brazilians when persecuted found their way back to Ghana, Togo, Benin and Nigeria especially those who organised the Malê Revolt. In Ghana, it is common to find family names like de Souza, Silva, or Cardoso. Some of them have been very well known in Ghana.

Afro-Brazilians in Ghana
 In Ghana, the representative group of people that decided to come back from Brazil is the Tabom people. They came back on a ship called SS Salisbury, offered by the British government. About seventy Afro-Brazilians of seven different families arrived in South Ghana and Accra, in the region of the old port in James Town in 1836. The reception by the Mantse Nii Ankrah of the Otublohum area was so warm that they decided to settle down in Accra. The leader of the Tabom group at the time of their arrival was a certain Nii Azumah Nelson. The eldest son of Azumah Nelson, Nii Alasha, was his successor and a very close friend to the Ga King Nii Tackie Tawiah. Together they helped in the development of the whole community in commerce.

At the present, the Tabom Mantse is Nii Azumah V, a descendant of the Nelsons. The Taboms are also known as the founders of the First Scissors House in 1854, the first tailoring shop in the country, which had amongst other activities, the task to provide the Ghanaian Army with uniforms. One notable figure is Dan Morton, a Tabom and one of the most famous tailors in Accra today.

In Ghana, the de Souza family can be found around Osu, Kokomlemle and other parts of the Greater Accra region and South Ghana. Sekondi-Takoradi and Cape Coast are also other bases. Almost all of them remained along the coastal regions of South Ghana. However, it is very common to see a De Souza, a Wellington, a Benson, a Josiah, a Pereria, a Palmares, a Nelson, an Azumah, Amorin, Da Costa, Santos, De Medeiros, Nunoo, Olympio, Maslieno, Maselino (a changed version of 'Maslieno' by the late Rev. Canon Seth Nii Adulai Maselino ((1919 - 1994)) whose parents originated from Maslieno House in Adabraka, Accra) and other Afro-Brazilians in Ghana speaking perfect Ga-Adangbe.
 This is because most of the Afro-Brazilian people married Ga-Adangbes.

Because they were welcomed by the Ga-Adangbe people and received by their kings as personal guests, the Taboms received lands in privileged locations, in places that are nowadays very well-known estates, like Asylum Down, the area near to the central train station and around the Accra Brewery Company. In those areas, the mango trees planted by them bear silent witnesses to their presence. In the estate of North Ridge there is a street called “Tabom Street”, which is a reminder of the huge plantations that they formerly had there. Some of the Taboms live nowadays in James Town, where the first house built and used by them as they arrived in South Ghana is located. It is called the "Brazil House" and can be found in a short street with the name “Brazil Lane”. Because of their agricultural skills, they started plantations of mango, cassava, beans, and other vegetables. They brought also skills such as irrigation techniques, architecture, carpentry, blacksmithing, gold smithing, tailoring, amongst others, which certainly improved the quality of life of the whole community.

Nowadays the Taboms are completely integrated into Ghanaian society and are a part of the Ga-Adangbe people.

See also 
 Azumah Nelson

External links
 Short History of the Tabom People, Courtesy of the Brazilian Embassy in Accra, Ghana
 Book "Tabom. The Afro-Brazilian Community in Ghana"

References

Afro-Brazilian people
Repatriated Africans
People of Liberated African descent
Brazilian diaspora in Africa
Ethnic groups in Ghana